VH1 Storytellers is the second live album and video by American singer Alicia Keys. It was released on June 25, 2013 by RCA Records. The album was recorded as a part of the television show VH1 Storytellers; the episode originally aired on November 12, 2012.

Track listing

Charts

Weekly charts

Year-end charts

References

External links 
 VH1 Storytellers at Discogs

Alicia Keys live albums
2013 live albums
VH1 Storytellers
2013 video albums
Live video albums
RCA Records video albums
Alicia Keys video albums
RCA Records live albums